This article lists events that occurred during 1960 in Estonia.

Incumbents

Events
July 21 – Tallinn Department Store was opened.

Births
24 June – Kaja Tael, philologist, translator and diplomat
23 November – Karl Madis,  musician

Deaths

References

 
1960s in Estonia
Estonia
Estonia
Years of the 20th century in Estonia